How to Be a Bookie is an upcoming American comedy series created by Chuck Lorre and starring Sebastian Maniscalco. The series is set to premiere on HBO Max.

Cast
 Sebastian Maniscalco as Danny
 Omar Dorsey as Ray
 Andrea Anders as Sandra
 Vanessa Ferlito as Lorraine
 Jorge Garcia as Hector
 Maxim Swinton as Anthony

Production
On October 4, 2022, it was announced that HBO Max had given an eight-episode straight-to-series order to a comedy series created by Chuck Lorre. It was also announced that Sebastian Maniscalco would star in a leading role in the series.

On November 7, 2022, it was announced that Omar Dorsey, Andrea Anders, Vanessa Ferlito and Jorge Garcia had joined the cast. On December 13, 2022, it was announced that Maxim Swinton had also joined the cast.

Chuck Lorre (through his Chuck Lorre Productions banner), Nick Bakay, Sebastian Maniscalco and Judi Marmel are executive-producing the series for Warner Bros. Television.

References

External links
 

English-language television shows
Television series by Warner Bros. Television Studios
Television series created by Chuck Lorre
HBO Max original programming
Upcoming comedy television series